Nemesis is a science fiction novel by American writer Isaac Asimov. One of his later science fiction novels, it was published in 1989, three years before his death. The novel is loosely related to the future history of his Robot Series, Empire Series, and Foundation Series, into which Asimov attempted to integrate his science fiction output. This novel is connected to Asimov's other works by several ideas from earlier and later novels, including non-human intelligence, sentient astronomical bodies ("Hallucination"), and rotor engines (Fantastic Voyage II: Destination Brain).

Plot summary
The novel is set in an era in which interstellar travel is in the process of being discovered and perfected. In Chapter 2, the novel states that the year 2220 was 16 years ago. Accordingly, the bulk of the novel takes place in or around the year 2236.

Before the novel's opening, "hyper-assistance", a technology allowing travel at a little slower than the speed of light, is used to move a reclusive space station colony called Rotor from the vicinity of Earth to the newly discovered red dwarf Nemesis. There, it takes up orbit around the semi-habitable moon Erythro, named for the red light that falls on it.

It is eventually discovered that the bacterial life on Erythro forms a collective organism that possesses a form of consciousness and telepathy (a concept similar to the Gaia of Asimov's Foundation series). While the colonists argue over the direction of future colonization—down to Erythro, or up to the asteroid belts of Nemesis system—events catch up with them. Back on Earth superluminal flight is perfected, ending Rotor Colony's isolation and opening the galaxy to human exploration.

The story also relates the breakup and reunion of a family. The mother, who discovered Nemesis, and her daughter were separated from the Earthbound father when the colony departed. The father then becomes part of the hyperjump research project as a result. Important in the novel is the startling discovery that the bacterial inhabitants of Erythro collectively constitute a sentient and telepathic organism and the discovery and resolution of a massive crisis: Nemesis' trajectory threatens to gravitationally destabilize the Solar System.

Story notes

The demands of the plot required Asimov to hypothesize a planetary system about a star named Nemesis. At the time of the writing, the name Nemesis was given to a hypothetical companion to Earth's Sun that could provide a mechanism for periodic disturbances of comets in the Oort cloud, which would then fall inwards causing mass extinctions. The red dwarf star in the book turns out not to be this companion; it is simply passing through the Solar System.

The planetary system in the book included a gas giant planet named Megas in a very short-period orbit about its primary star. (Erythro is a moon of Megas.) This was a radical idea in 1989, but was vindicated with the discovery of the first extrasolar planet orbiting a sun-like star (51 Pegasi) in 1995, dubbed "Bellerophon".  Furthermore, the first speculated "habitable" planet discovered, Gliese 581c, orbits a red dwarf star (Gliese 581) located only 20.3 light years from Earth—a notable similarity to the novel wherein Erythro is the first inhabited extra–solar body.

In the foreword of the novel, Asimov stated that Nemesis is not a part of the Foundation universe that consists of the Foundation, Robot, and Empire series. In his autobiography he said that it was in fact his editor Jennifer Brehl who had suggested a novel which was "not part of either the Foundation series or the Robot series, but ... an entirely independent background." In the foreword he also stated that he may change his mind on the matter.
 
Some have suspected that the radiation from the star Nemesis may have been intended to be another possible reason for the radiation on Earth forcing emigration. However, Nemesis is referred to in Forward the Foundation, where Hari Seldon refers to a twenty-thousand-year-old story of "a young woman that could communicate with an entire planet that circled a sun named Nemesis." A few commentators noted that Nemesis contains barely disguised references to the Spacers and their calendar system, the Galactic Empire and even to Hari Seldon which seem to have been deliberately placed for the purpose of later integration into the Foundation universe.

According to Alasdair Wilkins, in a discussion posted on Gizmodo, "Asimov absolutely loves weird, elliptical structures. All three of his non-robot/Foundation science fiction novels — The End of Eternity, [The Gods Themselves], and Nemesis — leaned heavily on non-chronological narratives, and he does it with gusto [in The Gods Themselves]."

Major characters 
 Eugenia Insigna Fisher: from the Euro-dominated Rotor Colony; astronomer for the Far Probe project; discoverer of Nemesis
 Crile Fisher: a fetcher (technological espionage operative) for Earth
 Marlene Fisher: homely daughter of Crile and Eugenia; can read body language exceptionally well
 Dr. Janus Pitt: Commissioner of Rotor; enemy of Eugenia, Crile, and Marlene
 Siever Genarr: Erythro Dome Chief, former admirer of Eugenia
 Ranay D'Aubisson: Chief Neurophysicist of the Erythro Dome
 Tessa Anita Wendel: from Adelia Colony; Chief Physicist in Superluminal Theory
 Kattimoro Tanayama: Director of Earth Intelligence
 Igor Koropatsky: Tanayama's successor after he dies
 Aurinel Pampas: attractive 17-year-old boy on whom Marlene has a crush

References

External links
 
 
 Review at sfsite.com

1989 American novels
Science fiction novels by Isaac Asimov
Nonlinear narrative novels